José Luis Flores Méndez (born 28 April 1956) is a Mexican politician affiliated with the PRI. He currently serves as Deputy of the LXII Legislature of the Mexican Congress representing Coahuila. He also served as Deputy during the 1994–97 period.

References

1956 births
Living people
Politicians from San Pedro, Coahuila
Institutional Revolutionary Party
21st-century Mexican politicians
Deputies of the LXII Legislature of Mexico
Members of the Chamber of Deputies (Mexico) for Coahuila